The Battle of Ocho Rios also known as Battle of Las Chorreras was a military action which took place on the island of Jamaica on 30 October 1657 where a Spanish force under Cristóbal Arnaldo Isasi hoping to take back the island was defeated by the English occupying force under the Governor Edward D'Oyley.

The English had occupied Jamaica in 1655 but had been reduced significantly by disease in the aftermath. They ran through governors at a rapid rate: General Robert Sedgwick arrived and died in 1655, General William Brayne replaced him and died in 1656, and then General Edward D'Oyley who had already been on the island took over as Governor being acclimatised to the island's harsh tropical conditions.

Two years after the English invasion, Cristóbal Arnaldo Isasi, the former Spanish governor, had been hiding in the hills with the runaway slaves (later known as maroons). He requested a force to be sent from Cuba to retake the island for Spain. He now had reinforcements from Cuba and had them land at Las Chorreros (present day Ocho Rios). By now he had assembled a total of nearly 300 soldiers and around 100 militia or guerrillas. D'Oyley, aware of Spanish ships being seen off the northern coast, decided to set out and attack. He sailed north to meet them and landed his force of around 900 militia near Ocho Rios, where, close to Dunn's River Falls he defeated Isasi and his force in a short battle. Isasi fled back into the hills whilst the rest of the Spanish were captured and were later repatriated back to Cuba under terms.

Isasi tried again in 1658 at Rio Nuevo but this time with reinforcements from New Spain and the presence of a fort. In a repeat of what happened at Ocho Rios D'Oyley achieved the same feat by sailing north and defeated him again.

See also
 History of Jamaica
 Military history of Britain
 Spanish Empire

Notes

References
 Firth, C.H. Last Years of the Protectorate vol. II (London 1909)

External links
 British Civil Wars, Commonwealth and Protectorate website – The Anglo-Spanish War 1655–1660 

Conflicts in 1657
Battles in Jamaica
Battles involving England
Battles involving Spain
1657 in the Colony of Santiago
1657 in Jamaica
1658 in the British Empire
1658 in the Caribbean
Anglo-Spanish War (1654–1660)